The 2020  Copa Federación de España was the 28th edition of the Copa Federación de España, also known as Copa RFEF, a knockout competition for Spanish football clubs in Segunda División B and Tercera División.

The competition began in September with the first games of the Regional stages and ended in December with the final of the National tournament. As part of the new competition format started in 2019, the four semifinalists qualified to the Copa del Rey first round.

Regional tournaments

Andalusia tournament
The Andalusia Football Federation (RFAF) decided to create the 'Copa RFAF' in 2020. The finalists would be the Andalusian representatives in the Copa Federación national phase.

The best Andalusian teams in groups 9 (Eastern Andalusia and Melilla) and 10 (Western Andalusia and Ceuta) of the 2019–20 Tercera División not qualified for the 2020–21 Copa del Rey were selected for the competition. The best and second-best qualified teams of each group were seeded and played the quarter-final matches against the fourth and third-best qualified teams of their groups, respectively. The semi-finals were then between the winners from the same group, in order to have one finalist, and therefore one team qualified for the national phase, from each group.

On 22 August, during the Assembly of the RFAF, the venues of the semi-finals and the final and the dates of all matches were announced.

Semifinals

Final

Aragon tournament
Ejea and Brea joined the tournament.

Final

Asturias tournament
Due to the delay on starting the competitions, the tournament was played in a reduced format based on single-match rounds. 12 teams joined the competition. Semifinals and Final were played at Estadio Hermanos Antuña, in Mieres with a limited maximum attendance of 1,000 spectators, after they were moved from Estadio Ganzábal, in Langreo due to an outbreak of the COVID-19 pandemic in Asturias.

Seeded teams joined the competition in the second round. In the first two rounds, if a match ended in a draw the best-ranked team qualified. In the semi-finals and the final, in case of draw there would be directly a penalty shootout, without playing any overtime.

The matches of the two first rounds were played at the stadium of the worst qualified team.

Final

Balearic Islands tournament
Platges de Calvià was directly selected by Federació de Futbol de les Illes Balears.

Basque Country tournament
Three teams joined the tournament: Balmaseda, Real Unión and Urduliz.

Final

Canary Islands tournament
Tenisca was directly selected by Federación Canaria de Fútbol due to sporting merits (being the better team qualified in 2019-20 Tercera División not yet qualified to Copa del Rey).

Cantabria tournament
Tropezón was directly selected by Federación Cántabra de Fútbol due to sporting merits (being the better team qualified in 2019-20 Tercera División not yet qualified to Copa del Rey).

Castile-La Mancha tournament
Eight teams joined the tournament.

Final

Castile and León tournament
Four teams joined the tournament: Arandina, Bupolsa, Santa Marta and Unionistas. The draw was made 22 September.

Final

Catalonia tournament
Federació Catalana de Fútbol did not send any team to the tournament.

Extremadura tournament
18 teams joined the tournament, consisting in a single-game knockout tournament.

Final

Galicia tournament
Estradense, Pontellas, Rápido de Bouzas and Silva joined the tournament. The draw was made 24 September.

Final

La Rioja tournament
Three teams joined the tournament: Arnedo, Casalarreina and Náxara. The draw was made 22 September.

Final

Madrid tournament

Preliminary round
Group 1

Group 2

Final
The final will be played in the García de la Mata field in Madrid. Each game will last 45 minutes.

Murcia tournament
Mar Menor was directly selected by Federación de Fútbol de la Región de Murcia due to sporting merits (being the best team qualified in 2019–20 Tercera División that was not yet qualified to the Copa del Rey).

Navarre tournament
Beti Kozkor was directly selected by Federación Navarra de Fútbol due to sporting merits (being the better team qualified in 2019-20 Tercera División not yet qualified to Copa del Rey).

Valencian Community tournament
3 teams joined the tournament: Alzira, Intercity and Villajoyosa. The tournament was played in the Guillermo Olagüe field in Gandia. Each game lasted 45 minutes.

National phase
National phase was played between October and December with 32 teams (18 winners of the Regional Tournaments and 14 teams of Segunda División B). The four semifinalists qualified to 2020–21 Copa del Rey first round.

Times are CET/CEST, (local times, if different, are in parentheses).

Qualified teams

Best non-reserve teams from 2019–20 Segunda División B not qualified to 2020–21 Copa del Rey (3 from each group plus the next best 2 overall)
 Barakaldo (3)
 Ebro (3)
 Gimnàstic (3)
 Langreo (3)
 Las Rozas (3)
 Llagostera (3)
 Leioa (3)
 Melilla (3)
 Murcia (3)
 Racing Ferrol (3)
 Recreativo (3)
 Salamanca UDS (3)
 UCAM Murcia (3)
 Villarrubia (3)

Winners of Autonomous Communities tournaments
 Arnedo (4)
 Balmaseda (4)
 Beti Kozkor (4)
 Calvo Sotelo (4)
 Caudal (4)
 Ejea (3)
 Intercity (4)
 Mar Menor (4)
 Moralo (4)
 Platges de Calvià (4)
 Rápido de Bouzas (4)
 Tenisca (4)
 Torredonjimeno (4)
 Tropezón (4)
 Unionistas (3)
 Utrera (4)
 Móstoles URJC (4)
 (Vacant)

Draw
The draw of all the tournament was held at the headquarters of the RFEF on 5 October. Teams were divided into four pots according to geographical criteria. Each pot will play independently until the semi-finals.

Bracket

Round of 32
Pot A

Pot B

Pot C

Mar Menor (4) was given a bye to Round of 16.

Pot D

Round of 16
Pot A

Pot B

Pot C

Pot D

Quarter-finals
Winners qualified to the 2020–21 Copa del Rey first round.
Pot A

Pot B

Pot C

Pot D

Semi-finals

Final

Top goalscorers

Notes

References

External links
Royal Spanish Football Federation 

2019-20
3
2019–20 Segunda División B
2019–20 Tercera División